Micropsephodes is a genus of beetles in the family Anamorphidae. There are at least two described species in Micropsephodes.

Species
These two species belong to the genus Micropsephodes:
 Micropsephodes lundgreni Leschen & Carlton, 2000
 Micropsephodes serraticornis Champion, 1913

References

Further reading

 

Coccinelloidea genera
Articles created by Qbugbot